Connecticut's 37th House of Representatives district elects one member of the Connecticut House of Representatives. It consists of the towns of East Lyme and Salem. It has been represented by Republican Holly Cheeseman since 2017.

Recent elections

2020

2018

2016

2014

2012

References

37